The ARK-Z-1, was a single-engined transport aircraft designed and produced in the USSR from 1933.

Development
Zlokazov formed a small design bureau, at the GVF repair plant at Irkutsk, to create a transport aircraft for use in the Arctic regions. The aircraft was based on the PS-4, which was  a Soviet built Junkers W33, with an enclosed, heated, cockpit and cabin for ten passengers or 880 kg of cargo loaded through a double set of doors on the port fuselage side. The undercarriage introduced oleo-pneumatic shock absorbers with large low-pressure tyres which could be exchanged for skis when necessary, and a good field performance was ensured through use of powered landing flaps. The ARK-Z-1 satisfactorily completed the factory flight test programme and the aircraft was then flown to Moscow for testing by the NII GVF during the Autumn of 1935.  Production was not pursued due to the obsolescent structure.

Specifications (ARK-Z-1)

See also

References

 Gunston, Bill. “The Osprey Encyclopaedia of Russian Aircraft 1875 – 1995”. London, Osprey. 1995. 

1930s Soviet airliners